Olivibacter composti is a Gram-negative and aerobic bacterium from the genus of Olivibacter which has been isolated from compost from a greenhouse in Taiwan.

References

External links
Type strain of Olivibacter composti at BacDive -  the Bacterial Diversity Metadatabase

Sphingobacteriia
Bacteria described in 2017